Antti Iivari (born March 11, 1992) is a Finnish ice hockey player. He is currently playing with Lahti Pelicans in the Finnish SM-liiga.

Iivari made his SM-liiga debut playing with Lahti Pelicans during the 2012–13 SM-liiga season.

References

External links

1992 births
Living people
Finnish ice hockey forwards
Lahti Pelicans players
People from Rovaniemi
Sportspeople from Lapland (Finland)